Anthony Michael Mortimer (born 21 October 1970 in Stepney, London) is a British singer, songwriter and record producer from London. He is a former member of the boy band East 17, who were originally active from 1991 to 1997 and sold over 20 million records worldwide. Mortimer wrote the band's only number-one single, "Stay Another Day".

Career
Mortimer was a member of the 1990s boy band East 17, with whom he had seven top ten singles and four hit albums on the UK Singles Chart and UK Albums Chart respectively between 1992 and 1997. He turned to songwriting when the group disbanded in 1997, due to negative media coverage after fellow member Brian Harvey said that he had taken 12 ecstasy tablets in one night. In 1998, Mortimer's East 17 bandmates briefly re-formed the group without him, and released two singles as E-17. They disbanded again the following year.

During his time in East 17, Tony wrote the Childliners "The Gift of Christmas" which was a charity single featuring other popular chart acts at the time such as MN8, Backstreet Boys, Peter Andre, Boyzone and Dannii Minogue among others.

In 2010, East 17 re-formed as a three piece (minus former lead singer, Brian Harvey) and were seeking a new lead singer, a position filled in 2011 by Blair Dreelan. They released the single "Secret of My Life" from the projected album Recharged but Dreelan left the band due to a contractual obligation not to contribute to East 17, while he was still connected with his previous musical group.  The band scrapped the album and in 2012 released the newly recorded, Dark Light, with Mortimer in place as the lead vocalist. The group toured Europe throughout 2011 and in early 2012. In June 2012 they returned to Australia for the first time in over 15 years. Two singles were released from Dark Light; "I Can't Get You Off my Mind" and "Friday Night", whilst a third single, "Counting Clouds", was due for release in July 2012.

Mortimer has continued as a record producer since 1997, from his studio in Essex, as well as recording his own songs including the single "N Toxyc 8".

Mortimer has also managed bands, including girl group Urban Angel, whose members included Roxanne Pallett, who wrote some of the group's songs. The band broke up after Pallett won a role in ITV soap opera Emmerdale.

Mortimer appeared on Never Mind the Buzzcocks in Season 19 on Episode 3. He competed in the BBC's Winter Wipeout series in March 2012 and finished second, ahead of former Coronation Street star Steven Arnold, but behind the winner Eddie "The Eagle" Edwards.

In December 2012, Mortimer appeared as a panellist on Channel 5 show The Wright Stuff and again in June 2013. on 17 June 2013 he released his debut solo album Songs from the Suitcase. In early 2014, Mortimer departed from East 17 to focus more on his solo career. In December 2019, Mortimer released a re-recorded version of ‘Stay Another Day’ with the  Waltham Forest Youth Choir, to raise money for mental health charity CALM.

Personal life
Mortimer has two daughters with his partner Tracey. The award-winning lyrics of his song, "Stay Another Day", were inspired by the death of his brother, Ollie, by suicide. In October 2000, Mortimer was chosen as one of four pall bearers at the funeral of gangster Reggie Kray.

Awards
Ivor Novello Awards
 Songwriter of the Year (won)
 The Best Selling Song – "Stay Another Day" (nominated)
 The PRS Most Performed Work  – "Stay Another Day" (nominated)

Discography

Albums
 Songs from the Suitcase (2013)

Singles
N Toxyc 8 (2006)
We Will Stand (with Fighters Forever) (2002)
Shake It Down (2013) 
Rain in England (with Julian Lennon) (2013)
Stay Another Day (2013)

See also
List of Shooting Stars episodes
List of Never Mind the Buzzcocks episodes

References

1970 births
Living people
East 17 members
English pop singers
English male singers
English male rappers
English record producers
English songwriters
People from Stepney
Singers from London
Ivor Novello Award winners